Ogden Creek is a tributary of Back Creek in Cumberland County, New Jersey in the United States.

Joseph Ogden owned land at Mill Creek in Fairfield Township. Presumably, the creek was named after him and his family.

See also
List of rivers of New Jersey

References

External links
Ogden Creek's origin

Rivers of Cumberland County, New Jersey
Rivers of New Jersey
Tributaries of Delaware Bay